Vedi is a 2011 Indian Tamil-language action film directed by Prabhu Deva. The film stars Vishal, Sameera Reddy and Poonam Kaur, while Vivek, Sayaji Shinde, and Urvashi play supporting roles. A remake of super hit Telugu film Souryam, the film was released on 30 September 2011 across 250 screens in Tamil Nadu, 62 screens in Kerala and 28 screens in Karnataka.

Plot 
Vedi tells the story of Prabhakaran (Vishal), a young police officer who goes to Kolkata in search of his sister Aishwarya (Poonam Kaur). Prabhakaran, at his native place, Thoothukudi, had developed enmity with a local don named Easwaramoorthy (Sayaji Shinde) by thrashing him in public and putting him behind bars. The enmity reaches Kolkata when Easwaramoorthy joins another local gangster to take revenge on Prabhakaran. The baddies trouble Aishwarya and her friend Parvathy (Sameera Reddy), who falls in love with Prabhakaran. While the enmity between Prabhakaran and Easwaramoorthy continues, a flashback of Prabhakaran goes on. Prabhakaran and Aishwarya were ill-treated by the society as their father was a smuggler. Prabhakaran decides to send Aishwarya to an orphanage, saying that he does not know who she is. This creates a bad name about Prabhakaran in Aishwarya's books. Later, Aishwarya gets adopted by a North Indian family and settles in Kolkata. In a parallel scenario, Prabhakaran locks horns with Easwaramoorthy and his pervert son Rajapandi (Amit Kumar Tiwari). They kill his mentor, who made him a police officer, and the occasion of giving a doctorate to Easwaramoorthy, Rajapandi gets tempted of a lady constable outside the stadium and rapes her inside his car. After a few years, Aishwarya's foster parents die of an accident, and she is sent to an orphanage again. Therefore, Prabhakaran goes to Kolkata and masquerades himself as Balu, a physical trainer in a college as he is scared that Aishwarya might avoid him. How Prabhakaran defeats the baddies and joins with Aishwarya is the action-packed climax of the movie.

Cast 

 Vishal as ASP Prabhakaran IPS/ Balu
 Sameera Reddy as Parvathy "Paaru"
 Poonam Kaur as Aishwarya
 Vivek as Varun Sandhesh
 Sayaji Shinde as Easwaramoorthy
 Urvashi as Dr. Radha Jeyachandran
 Sriman as Sreenivasan "Cheemachu"
 Raviprakash as Parvathy's father
 Uma Padmanabhan as Parvathy's mother
 Amit Kumar Tiwari as Rajapandi
 Anu Mohan
 Bava Lakshmanan as Kali temple priest
 Pandu
 Sampath Ram
 Sneha Nambiar as P. Kalai Selvi
 Devi Sri Prasad in a special appearance in the song "Kadhalikka"
 Sophie Choudry in an item number "Bombay Ponnu"

Production 
In July 2010, it was revealed that GK Film Corporation had signed on Prabhu Deva to direct a film featuring Vishal in the lead role. Initially Trisha Krishnan was approached for the lead female role but turned it down as the role did not excite her, Similarly Anushka Shetty refused the project, while Hansika Motwani cited that her call sheet was full. Reports emerged that Samantha, Kajal Aggarwal, Tamannaah Bhatia and Reemma Sen were considered, before the role was handed to Sameera Reddy. Poonam Kaur signed the film in March 2011, agreeing to reprise her role as the protagonist's sister from the original. The scenes were shot in Sri Sivasubramaniya Nadar College of Engineering with all lead roles.

Vishal began his first schedule in February 2011, after completing work from his other film Avan Ivan. An item song featuring Sophie Choudry was shot in April 2011 for the film. By May 2011, it was reported that 80% of the shoot was completed after scenes were shot in Bidar a district in the north of Karnataka State. The team then shot a song in Pollachi later that month.The movie, originally titled Prabhakaran (also the name of LTTE leader Velupillai Prabhakaran), was renamed Vedi and was released by Sun Pictures on 30 September 2011.

Release 
The satellite rights of the film were sold to Sun TV.

Critical reception 
Vedi received mixed to positive reviews from critics and audiences. Nowrunning.com rated it 3/5 and called it" a loud cracker" Supergoodmovies.com rated it 3/5,calling it entertaining and enjoyable. Oneindia.com similarly rated 3/5, calling it a paisa vasool entertainer.

Soundtrack 

Vedi's soundtrack, composed by Vijay Antony, released on 5 September 2011 receiving positive reviews. The song "Bombay Ponnu" became first and only Tamil song at the moment for singer Mamta Sharma of Munni Badnaam Hui song fame.

References

External links 
 

Films shot in Kolkata
Tamil remakes of Telugu films
Films directed by Prabhu Deva
2011 films
Films shot in Karnataka
2010s Tamil-language films
2011 masala films
2011 action films
Indian action films
Films scored by Vijay Antony
Films set in Kolkata
Fictional portrayals of the Tamil Nadu Police
Films shot in Pollachi